Andrew "Rocky" Raczkowski (born December 29, 1968) is an American politician from Michigan who was the 2010 Republican nominee for .

Early life, education and career 
A resident of Troy, he is a retired lieutenant colonel with the U.S. Army Reserves. He served as the Chief Executive of Star Tickets Plus from 2007-2010  Raczkowski endorse Rick Perry for the 2012 republican primary, and co chaired several events for his election, after Perry withdrawal, Raczkowski endorsed Rick Santorum. In the 2016 primaries, Raczkowski endorsed Ted Cruz.

Michigan House of Representatives 
Raczkowski was a member of the Michigan House of Representatives from 1997 to 2003, representing the 37th District (Farmington and Farmington Hills). In 2002 he was term-limited, as Michigan House members cannot serve more than three two-year terms. Described as a militant law and order Republican Raczkowski was known for his extreme stances against Marijuana, Public Transit, and Detroit which has attracted controversy from both sides.

Political campaigns

2002 U.S. Senate campaign 

Raczkowski won the Republican nomination for the United States Senate, but lost to the popular longtime Democratic incumbent Carl Levin by 60.6% to 37.9%.

2008 U.S. Senate campaign 

Raczkowski was planning on running in the Republican primary to challenge Levin again, but when he was called up for active duty, he was forced to drop out of the race.

2010 U.S. Congressional campaign 

Raczkowski won the Republican primary on August 3, 2010. Raczkowski was dogged by advertisements revealing a civil action against him, in the United States District Court of South Dakota, for fraud, theft, and breach of contract by a concert promoter (case dismissed). Raczkowski's own lawsuit, alleging defamation in the advertisements, was thrown out in January 2011. Raczkowski's fraud trial was scheduled to begin on October 15, 2013 (dismissed).

References

External links
 
Campaign contributions at OpenSecrets.org
Voting record at Michigan Votes

1968 births
Living people
Republican Party members of the Michigan House of Representatives
People from Farmington Hills, Michigan